Unitheism may refer to:

 Panentheism
 Pantheism
 Theocracy or another social system in which there is only one code of beliefs extant

See also
 Monotheism